The 1995 Flateyri avalanche was an avalanche that struck the village of Flateyri in Iceland’s Westfjords on 26 October 1995, killing 20 people. It came 8 months after an avalanche in Súðavík killed 14 people. The disasters had a profound effect on the nation and sparked a massive buildup of avalanche dams to protect towns in danger zones.

The avalanche fell from Skollahvilft  at around 4:00 AM, and destroyed 17 houses. 45 people were in the houses hit by the avalanche, 21 managed to escape on their own and four were later rescued alive.

References

External links
1995 Flateyri avalanche on RÚV

1990s avalanches
1995 natural disasters
Avalanches in Iceland
October 1995 events in Europe